Give-away shops, freeshops, free stores or swap shops are stores where all goods are free. They are similar to charity shops, with mostly second-hand items—only everything is available at no cost. Whether it is a book, a piece of furniture, a garment or a household item, it is all freely given away, although some operate a one-in, one-out–type policy (swap shops). The free store is a form of constructive direct action that provides a shopping alternative to a monetary framework, allowing people to exchange goods and services outside of a money-based economy.

History
The anarchist 1960s countercultural group the Diggers opened free stores which simply gave away their stock, provided free food, distributed free drugs, gave away money, organized free music concerts, and performed works of political art. The Diggers took their name from the original English Diggers led by Gerrard Winstanley and sought to create a mini-society free of money and capitalism.

Similar phenomena 
Another recent development in the give-away shop movement is the creation of the Freecycle Network. It began in the state of Arizona, United States, for the purpose of connecting people who had extra belongings to get rid of with people who needed something, organized as discussion/distribution lists, and usually hosted on one of the free websites. A similar concept has operated in Australia from 2011 via Ziilch, a web site that allows free listing of goods to be acquired by others at no cost.

See also 

 Charity (practice)
 Drive (charity)
 Food bank
 Food Not Bombs
 Gift economy
 Recycling
 Regiving
 Reuse
 Take a penny, leave a penny

References 

Giving
Recycling
Anarchist movements
Retail formats
Reuse